Eslamabad (2) (also Romanized as Eslāmābād (2); also known as Eslāmābād and Gashūlak) is a village in Qaleh Rural District, in the Central District of Manujan County, Kerman Province, Iran. At the 2006 census, its population was 172, in 32 families.

References 

Populated places in Manujan County